Felipe Rubini (Montevideo, 20 October 2008) is a Uruguayan student, musician, composer and pianist.

Son of Solsiré Bertran and Federico Rubini. From a very early age he began to study music and piano. 
He was the winner of the Concurso Nacional de Piano de Uruguay (National Piano Competition of Uruguay) in 2021, held at the Vaz Ferreira Sodre Auditorium.

He performed at the Argentino Hotel, Carrasco International Airport,  Antel Arena, Sala Zitarrosa, etc.

He was on Susana Giménez's television show, and A solas con Lucas Sugo music program.
He was a contestant and semifinalist in the international format version of the talent television show Got Talent Uruguay in Channel 10.

I share stages and collaborations with Uruguayan violinist Edison Mouriño,  musician Lucas Sugo, Luana Persíncula, Jorge Nasser, Alejandro Spuntone, etc.

Award 
2021, National Piano Competition of Uruguay.

Television
 2019, Susana Giménez in Telefe.
 2020, A solas con Lucas Sugo
 2021, Got Talent Uruguay in Channel 10.
 2023, Desayunos informales in Channel 12.
 2023, La mañana en casa a Canal 10.

Simple 
 2020, Tree of life 
 2020, Run for love 
 2020, My Moon 
 2021, Mi mayor bendición 
 2022, Selah
 2022, Soy mejor (feat Alejandro Spuntone) 
 2022, Nudo en la garganta (feat Lucas Sugo)
 2022, Roto (feat Mariano Bermúdez)

Videoclip 
2020, Tree Of Life (director Guillermo Dranuta)
2021, Run For Love
2022, Roto (feat Mariano Bermúdez)
2022, Nudo en la Garganta  (feat Lucas Sugo)

References

External links 

 
 
 Felipe Rubini on Spotify

2008 births
Living people
Uruguayan pianists
Uruguayan composers
People from Montevideo